Yasir Elmacı (born 10 October 1981 in Konya, Turkey) is a Turkish retired footballer.

External links
 Profile at TFF.org

1981 births
Living people
Gençlerbirliği S.K. footballers
Sivasspor footballers
Kasımpaşa S.K. footballers
Altay S.K. footballers
Pendikspor footballers
Turkish footballers
Turkey youth international footballers

Association football midfielders